Ernesto Bonino (12 July 1899 – 2 June 1984) was an Italian professional footballer who played as a striker.

Club career
Bonino played for 7 seasons for A.S. Lucchese Libertas 1905.

International career
Bonino made his debut for the Italy national football team on 6 November 1921 in a game against Switzerland.

External links
 

1899 births
1984 deaths
Italian footballers
Italy international footballers
S.S.D. Lucchese 1905 players
People from La Spezia
Association football forwards
Footballers from Liguria
Sportspeople from the Province of La Spezia